Laipply is a surname. Notable people with the surname include:

Judson Laipply (born 1976), American motivational speaker and dancer 
Julie Laipply (born 1978), American author and role model